Counselman is a surname. Notable people with the surname include:

 John Counselman (1880–1955), American football player, coach, professor, and civil engineer
 Mary Elizabeth Counselman (1911–1995), American short story writer and poet

See also
 3528 Counselman, main-belt asteroid